Syed Ahmad Syed Abu Bakar (20 April 1946 – 1 June 2022) was a Malaysian footballer who played as a striker.

Career
With the Malaysia national team, Ahmad scored four goals in the Olympics qualification matches against Japan, South Korea and Philippines that helped Malaysia to qualify for 1972
Munich Olympics.

On 15 September 1974, he was a part of the team that won third place bronze medal in the 1974 Asian Games. He died at age 76 due to cancer.

Honours
Penang
 Burnley Cup: 1966
 Malaysia Kings Gold Cup: 1966, 1968, 1969
 Malaysia Cup: runner-up 1968, 1969

Penjara
 Malaya FAM Cup: 1970, 1971, 1973

Perak
 Malaysia Kings Gold Cup: 1974
 Malaysia Cup: runner-up 1974

Malaysia
 Pestabola Merdeka: 1968, 1974
 Asian Games: bronze medal 1974

References 

1946 births
2022 deaths 
Deaths from cancer in Malaysia
People from Johor
Malaysian footballers
Association football forwards
Malaysia international footballers
Footballers at the 1974 Asian Games
Asian Games bronze medalists for Malaysia